Shuko Aoyama and Rika Fujiwara were the defending champions, but Fujiwara chose not to participate. Aoyama paired up with Junri Namigata but lost in the first round to Chan Chin-wei and Hsu Wen-hsin.

Monique Adamczak and Stephanie Bengson won the title, defeating Misa Eguchi and Akiko Omae in the final, 6–4, 6–4.

Seeds

Draw

References 
 Draw

Fukuoka International Women's Cup - Doubles
Fukuoka International Women's Cup